Tonton is a genus of South American mygalomorph spiders in the family Microstigmatidae. It was first described by V. Passanha, I. Cizauskas and Antônio Domingos Brescovit in 2019, and it has only been found in Brazil.

Species
 it contains seven species:
T. emboaba (Pedroso, Baptista & Bertani, 2015) – Brazil
T. ipiau Passanha, Cizauskas & Brescovit, 2019 – Brazil
T. itabirito Passanha, Cizauskas & Brescovit, 2019 (type) – Brazil
T. matodentro Passanha, Cizauskas & Brescovit, 2019 – Brazil
T. queca Passanha, Cizauskas & Brescovit, 2019 – Brazil
T. quiteria Passanha, Cizauskas & Brescovit, 2019 – Brazil
T. sapalo Passanha, Cizauskas & Brescovit, 2019 – Brazil

See also
 Masteria
 List of Microstigmatidae species

References

Further reading

Microstigmatidae genera
Taxa named by Antônio Brescovit
Spiders of Brazil